The Oxford Historic District encompasses the peninsular portion of the town of Oxford, Maryland.  Established as the site of a ferry across the Tred Avon River in 1683, the historic portion of the town occupies a peninsula between that river and Town Creek.  The town did not experience any significant growth until the late 19th century, which is when most its buildings were constructed.  Most of these building were, however, built in a town grid that was laid out in the 17th century.  Although there are some late 18th and early 19th century buildings, late Victorian styles make up 90% of the district's building stock.

The district was listed on the National Register of Historic Places in 2005.

See also
National Register of Historic Places listings in Talbot County, Maryland

References

National Register of Historic Places in Talbot County, Maryland
Georgian architecture in Maryland
Federal architecture in Maryland
Historic districts on the National Register of Historic Places in Maryland